League of Estonian Corporations (Estonian: Eesti Korporatsioonide Liit, Estonian acronym: EKL) is an organisation that unites all-male academic corporations in Estonia. It was founded on March 28, 1915 by Vironia, Fraternitas Estica, Sakala, Ugala and Rotalia

Corporation Ugala suspended its membership on May 10, 2008 but returned in 2012.

Members
Vironia
Fraternitas Estica
Sakala 
Ugala
Rotalia
Fraternitas Liviensis
Leola
Revelia
Tehnola
Fraternitas Tartuensis

Wäinla and Fraternitas Ucuensis are both members, but they are not active in Estonia.

References

Student organizations in Estonia
1915 establishments in Estonia